Lorenzo King, best known by his stage name Renz Julian, is an American rapper, producer, and founder of Field of Dreamz Ent. Formerly known as Playa Renz, the Bay Area native originates from the cities of Oakland, Antioch, and San Jose, California. He is currently signed to Field of Dreamz Ent./Empire Distribution. He is known for his singles Clap, Clap featuring Clyde Carson, produced by Traxamillion, and Pop n' Lock remix featuring Twista, and E-40. The song was produced by Tom Slick, formerly of Collipark Music. King also played college football at St. Mary's College of California, then professional arena football for the Rapid City Flying Aces of the now defunct NIFL.

Releases 

2006: 2 The League mixed by DJ Cali
2007: Legal Crack mixed by DJ E-Rock
2008: Renz Julian EP
2008: Pop n' Lock ft. Twista (Single)
2009: Friday Night Lights ft. Big Rich & Dem Hoodstarz remix (Single)
2009: Fingaz of Gold
2009: Armageddon
2010: Pop n' Lock Part 2 (Single)
2011: From the Bay EP
2011: Alphabet Hustle mixed by the Demolition Men
2011: Day in the Life ft. J.Stalin (Single)
2012: Occupy the Block (Single)

Guest Appearances 

2007: Bay Bidness 3 mixed By DJ Whoo Kid (G-Unit) & DJ E-Rock
2010: Next on Deck Compilation-Various Artists
2011: Coast 2 Coast Mixtape 165 hosted by LEP Bogus Boys
2012: Coast 2 Coast Mixtape 192 hosted by N.O.R.E
2012: Stevie Joe Presents: Who Got Next Compilation

References 

 http://www.mtv.com/artists/renz-julian/
 http://www.billboard.com/#/album/renz-julian/2-the-league-mixtape-vol-1/1024271
 http://www.dubcnn.com/2012/04/19/renz-julian-readies-thug-scholarship-with-vitamin-d-single/
 http://www.empiredistribution.com/artists/renz-julian
 https://itunes.apple.com/us/artist/renz-julian/id152547390
 http://smcgaels.cstv.com/sports/m-footbl/mtt/king_lorenzo00.html
 https://www.youtube.com/watch?v=lRFjBNaeHSw
 http://www.musicthread.net/2009/07/18/renz-julian-collaborates-with-twista-and-e-40-for-pop-n-lock/#more-410
 http://www.alwayztherro.com/2010/11/10/renz-julian-shows-and-proves/

External links
 Renz Julian on Facebook
 Renz Julian on Twitter
 Renz Julian on Myspace
 Official Website
 FOD Entertainment

American male rappers
Rappers from the San Francisco Bay Area